Intoshia linei is a species of parasitic worms belonging to the family Rhopaluridae.

It is the only species from the phylum Orthonectida which genome has been sequenced.

References

Orthonectida